Azeez (27 November 1934 – 16 July 2003) was an Indian actor in Malayalam cinema. He acted in more than 100 films. He came into the movie industry as a villain, later he started doing character roles, such as police officer, jailer, and minister. He was a Deputy superintendent (D.Y.S.P) in Kerala Police. He was a member of K.P.A.C. (Kerala People's Arts Club), which was a prominent leftist drama troupe in Kerala, and thus he got famous as "K.P.A.C Azeez".

Family
Azeez was born and raised in the village of Thekkadda near Vembayam in Thiruvananthapuram district in Kerala, India. He graduated from University College. He was married to the late Sainam Beevi (teacher). The couple have three children, Naseema, A. M. Raja and Nazeera. His only son Raja Aziz is a Retired Sub Inspector in Kerala Police, television, cinema and drama artist in Malayalam. His grand child Azna is professionally a band singer.

Filmography

 Indriyam (2000)
 Pathram (1999)
 Vazhunnor (1999)
 Swastham Grihabharanam (1999)
 Stalin Sivadas (1999)
 F.I.R (1999)
 The Truth (1998)
 Aaghosham (1998)
 Lelam (1997) as Kunnel Mathachen
 Mahathma (1996)
 Dominic Presentation (1996) as D.I.G
 Arabikadaloram (1994) as Mahendran
 The King (1995)
 Vidheyan (1994)
 Chief Minister K. R. Gowthami (1994)
 Ekalavyan (1993)
 Janam (1993) as Madhavan Nair
 Kauravar (1992)
 Thalastaanam (1992)
 Oru Prathyeka Ariyippu (1991) as Kattumooppan
 Ee Thanutha Veluppan Kalathu (1990)
 Vembanaad (1990)
 Kalikkalam (1990)
 Mathilukal (1990)
 Nanma Niranjavan Sreenivasan (1990)
 Naduvazhikal (1989) Circle Inspector Bharathan
 Nair Saab (1989) 
 Kaalalppada (1989)
 Mathilukal (1989)
 Season (1989)
 Witness (1988)
 David David Mr. David (1988)
 Dhinarathrangal (1988)
 August 1 (1988)
 Thanthram (1988)
 Loose Loose Arappiri Loose (1988)
 Pattanapravesham (1988)
 Manu Uncle (1988)
 Anantharam (1987)
 Shyama (1986)
 Swaami Shree Naraayana Guru (1986)
 Katturumbinum Kaathukuthu (1986)
 Aavanazhi (1986)
 Rajavinte Makan (1986)
 Nandi Veendum Varika (1986)
 Ayanam (1985)
 Irakal (1985)
 Nirakkoottu (1985)
 Naavadakku Paniyedukku (1985)
 Onnaanaam Kunnil Oradikkunnil (1985)
 Ee Sabdam Innathe Sabdam (1985)
 Anakkorumma (1985) as Police officer
 Ithu Nalla Thamaasha (1985)
 Pachavelicham (1985) as Surendran
 Yathra (1985)
 Chakkarayumma (1984)
 Muthodumuthu (1984)
 Mukhamukham (1984)
 Piriyilla Naam (1984)
 Kadamattathachan (1984) as Kattumooppan
 Parannu Parannu Parannu (1984)
 Asthi (1983)... Govindan
 Uyarangalil (1984)
 Eettillam (1983)
 Maniyara (1983) as Inspector Abdul Muthalif
 Oru Maadapraavinte Kadha (1983)
 Enikkum Oru Divasam (1982) as DYSP John Samuel
 Thuranna Jail (1982) as Chachappan
 Ira Thedunna Manushyar (1981)
 Swarangal Swapnagal (1981) as Stephen
 Chamaram (1980)
 Chakara (1980) as SI Shivaraman Nair
 Kalika (1980)
 Peruvazhiyambalam (1979)
 Ival Oru Naadodi (1979)
 Saayoojyam (1979) as Raghavan
 Tharoo Oru Janmam Koodi (Thadavukaari) (1978)
 Kodiyettam (1978)
 Swapnadanam (1976) 
 Vanadevatha (1976) as Kannan
 Neelakannukal (1973)
 Nishaagandhi (1970)

Television
Velu Malu Circus (Doordarshan)
Mahathmagandhi Colony (Asianet)

References

 http://imprintsonindianfilmscreen.blogspot.com.au/2012/12/azeez.html
 http://www.mallumovies.org/artist/azeez
 http://entertainment.oneindia.in/celebs/azeez/filmography.html

External links

 Azeez at MSI

Indian male film actors
Male actors from Thiruvananthapuram
Male actors in Malayalam cinema
1934 births
2003 deaths
20th-century Indian male actors
21st-century Indian male actors
Indian male television actors
Male actors in Malayalam television